South Louisville Reformed Church is a historic church at 1060 Lynnhurst Avenue in Louisville, Kentucky.  It was built in 1908 and added to the National Register of Historic Places in 1983.

It is a frame Gothic Revival style church.

In 1908 it was built as the South Louisville Reformed Church; it was renamed to Lynnhurst Reformed Church in c.1925 after the area was annexed by Louisville and the street it was on was renamed to Lynnhurst, from Sycamore.

References

Churches on the National Register of Historic Places in Kentucky
Gothic Revival church buildings in Kentucky
Churches completed in 1908
20th-century churches in the United States
Churches in Louisville, Kentucky
National Register of Historic Places in Louisville, Kentucky
1908 establishments in Kentucky